David Comyn, Lord of Kilbride was a son of William Comyn, Lord of Badenoch, later the Earl of Buchan, and inherited the barony of Kilbride from his wife Isobel, the daughter of William de Valognes. He died in 1247.

Life
David was a younger son of William Comyn, Earl of Buchan and Lord of Badenoch and his first wife Sarah Fitzhugh. David was requested to join King Henry III of England's expedition into France in 1230; however, he paid scutage to not provide military service.

Marriage and issue
David married Isobel, the daughter of William de Valognes; they had the following known issue:
William – married Euphemia de Clavering, had issue

Citations

References
Pollock, M. A. Scotland, England and France After the Loss of Normandy, 1204-1296: "Auld Amitie", Volume 3; Boydell & Brewer Ltd, 2015 .

Year of birth unknown
1247 deaths